Franz Oppenheimer (March 30, 1864 – September 30, 1943) was a German Jewish sociologist and political economist, who published also in the area of the fundamental sociology of the state.

Life and career

After studying medicine in Freiburg and Berlin, Oppenheimer practiced as a physician in Berlin from 1886 to 1895. From 1890 onwards, he began to concern himself with sociopolitical questions and social economics. After his activity as a physician, he was editor-in-chief of the magazine Welt am Morgen, where he became acquainted with Friedrich Naumann, who was, at the time, working door-to-door for different daily papers.

In 1909, Oppenheimer earned a PhD in Kiel with a thesis about economist David Ricardo. From 1909 to 1917, Oppenheimer was a Privatdozent in Berlin, then for two years Titularprofessor. In 1914 he was one of co-founders of the German Committee for Freeing of Russian Jews. In 1919, he accepted a call to serve as Chair for Sociology and Theoretical Political Economy at Johann Wolfgang Goethe University in Frankfurt/Main. This was the first chair dedicated to Sociology in Germany.

A co-operative farm, the so-called "Co-operative in Merhavia", was founded in 1911 by Jewish immigrants to Ottoman Palestine using a plan for agricultural cooperation written by Oppenheimer. The project eventually failed and Merhavia was transformed in 1922 into a moshav, a different form of communal settlement.

From 1934 to 1935, Oppenheimer taught in Palestine. In 1936 he was appointed an honorary member of the American Sociological Association. In 1938, fleeing Nazi persecution, he emigrated via Tokyo and Shanghai to Los Angeles. In 1941 he became a founding member of The American Journal of Economics and Sociology.

Oppenheimer's son was Hillel Oppenheimer, a professor of botany at the Hebrew University of Jerusalem and an Israel Prize recipient.

Ideas

Der Staat (The State)
In 1908, Oppenheimer published Der Staat, in English The State. The book breaks down the origins of the modern state, identifying it as coming from conquering warlords and robber barons taking control over what would have been relatively free communities, each time ramping up the power of the ruling class.

Unlike Locke and others, Oppenheimer rejected the idea of the "social contract" and contributed to the "conquest theory of the state", heavily influenced by the earlier sociologist Ludwig Gumplowicz and his intertribal, intergroup competition, "race-conflict" (Rassenkampf) theories of the sociological genealogy of the state:

Oppenheimer saw the state as the original creator of inequality.

Oppenheimer considered himself a liberal socialist and has been described as pro-market; he thought that nonexploitative economic arrangements would work best in a collectivist environment. He spent much of his life advising people who wished to set up a voluntary, communitarian setting (especially kibbutzim). He rejected the view of anarchists and revolutionary socialists as unnecessarily pessimistic. Not violence, but the path of evolution, would bring about the desired social change. His ideal was a state without class or class interests in which the bureaucracy would become the impartial guardian of the common interests. In the United States Oppenheimer became a popularizer and devotee of the American social reformer Henry George. While Oppenheimer and George regarded the state as a longtime protector of privilege, they also believed that it was radically transformed by democracy. Government administrators were forced to show a humanitarian side which made the political class vulnerable. Oppenheimer, who died in 1943, saw Nazism and Bolshevism as representing last-gasp attempts to resurrect ancient tyranny. He hoped that their downfall would provide the prelude to a truly liberal epoch.

In the 1920s Der Staat was a widely read and heatedly discussed book. It was translated into English, French, Hungarian, Serbian, Japanese, Hebrew, Yiddish and Russian and has been influential among libertarians, communitarians and anarchists.

Oppenheimer was the teacher of German chancellor Ludwig Erhard who rejected his collectivism, but attributed to his professor his own vision of a European society of free and equal men. In 1964 Ludwig Erhard declared that:

Writings 
Oppenheimer created an extensive oeuvre of approximately 40 books and 400 essays which contain writings on sociology, economics, and the political questions of his time. One of the most renowned was Der Staat (The State).

 Freiland in Deutschland. Berlin, W.F. Fontane & Co., 1895.
 Der Staat.  1929.
 Gesammelte Schriften. Berlin
 Theoretische Grundlegung. 1995 
 Politische Schriften. 1996 
 Schriften zur Marktwirtschaft. 1998

See also 

 Classical liberalism
 Economic sociology
 Georgism
 Left-libertarianism
 Mutualism
 Our Enemy, the State
 Political sociology
 Ricardian socialism

Notes

Further reading

External links

Works 
 A First Program for Zionist Colonization. (1903)
 The State. (1914/1922); pdf, OLL
 
 The Idolatry of the State. (1927)
 History and Sociology. (1927)
 "Tendencies in Recent German Sociology" (Sociological Review, Vol. 24, 1932)
 A Post-Mortem on Cambridge Economics. (1943)

Other
 The personal papers of Franz Oppenheimer are kept at the   Central Zionist Archives in Jerusalem. The notation of the record group is A161.
 Directory of Oppenheimer related links
 History of the Institute of Social Research
 Book Burning – ushmm.org
 

1864 births
1943 deaths
German cooperative organizers
German anti-capitalists
German economists
Jewish emigrants from Nazi Germany to the United States
German male non-fiction writers
German socialists
German sociologists
German Zionists
Jewish socialists
Jewish sociologists
Liberal socialism
Writers from Berlin